Devil's Paintbrush may refer to:

 Pilosella aurantiaca, a flower in the daisy family
 Pilosella caespitosa, a flower in the daisy family
 The Devil's Paintbrush, a 2009 novel by Jack Arnott
 a machine gun, see Maxim gun
 a golf course in Ontario

See also
 "The Devil's Paintbrush Road", a song by Annabelle Chvostek from the 2004 album Burned My Ass